The Reunited Tour was a 2004 concert tour by English heavy metal band Judas Priest. It ran from 2 June 2004 until 2 September 2004. This tour celebrated the return of Rob Halford since his departure in 1992, replacing vocalist Tim "Ripper" Owens. The band also began performing in E♭ tuning during this tour, which would since be their primary sound.

The 25 June show from Valencia was filmed and used as part of a mini documentary entitled, Reunited, which is featured on the DualDisc release of the 2005 album Angel of Retribution.

Setlist

 "The Hellion"
 "Electric Eye"
 "Metal Gods"
 "Heading Out to the Highway"
 "The Ripper"
 "A Touch of Evil"
 "The Sentinel"
 "Turbo Lover"
 "Victim of Changes"
 "Diamonds & Rust" (Joan Baez cover)
 "Breaking the Law"
 "Beyond the Realms of Death"
 "The Green Manalishi (With the Two Prong Crown)" (Fleetwood Mac cover)
 "Painkiller"

Encore:
 "Hell Bent for Leather"
 "Living After Midnight"
 "United"
 "You've Got Another Thing Comin'"

Tour dates
The band embarked on a warm-up tour in Europe with Annihilator. They also took part in the 2004 edition of Ozzfest in North America as the co-headliner.

Cancelled dates

References

Judas Priest concert tours
2004 concert tours